Bindu is a Sanskrit word meaning "point", "drop" or "dot".

Philosophy

In Hindu metaphysics, Bindu is considered the point at which creation begins and may become unity. It is also described as "the sacred symbol of the cosmos in its unmanifested state". Bindu is the point around which the mandala is created, representing the universe.

Bindu is often merged with [seed] (or sperm) and ova. In the Yogachudamani Upanishad Bindu is a duality, with a white Bindu representing shukla (pure) and a red Bindu representing maharaj (mastery). The white Bindu resides in the bindu visarga and is related to Shiva and the Moon, while the red Bindu resides in the muladhara chakra and is related to Shakti and the Sun. In yoga, the union of these two parts results in the ascension of kundalini to the sahasrara.

In Tibetan Buddhism Bindu is a component of the subtle body, which is composed of drops (Tibetan: ཐིག་ལེ thig le) and winds (Tibetan: རླུང rLung).

Chakra

In Tantra, Bindu (or Bindu visarga—"falling of the drop") is a point at the back of the head where Brahmins grow their tuft of hair. This point is below the sahasrara chakra and above the ajna chakra, and is represented by a crescent moon with a white drop. It represents the manifestation of creations such as consciousness.

The chakra is visualised as a lotus with 23 petals. Its symbol is the moon, which supports the growth of vegetation. Krishna said in the Bhagavad Gita XV/13, "Becoming the nectarine moon I nourish all plants". Its divinity is Shiva, who is portrayed with the crescent moon in his hair.

In Hatha yoga

In Hatha yoga, Bindu visarga is said to be the source of Bindu fluid, which contains a nectar (amrita) and a poison. Bindu is identified with the semen, and it is controlled by techniques such as Viparita Karani and Khechari Mudra. The fluid is released from the Bindu visarga, and can be stored in the lalana chakra and purified in the Vishuddha chakra. When the Vishuddha is inactive the fluid flows to the manipura chakra, where it is consumed (leading to physical decline). According to the Hatha Yoga Pradipika, a hatha yoga practitioner can prolong their life by controlling the flow of the fluid. Through practice of Khecari mudra, a practitioner can manipulate the flow of the fluid from the lalana to the Vishuddha (where it is purified to amrita).

Practices

Exercises for the Bindu Chakra are:
 Agnisāra Kriyā
 Ujjāyī Prānāyāma with Khecharī Mudrā and Jālandhara Bandha
 Viparītakaranī (as a Mudrā)
 Śīrṣāsana
 Sarvāngāsana

There are also special Meditations on the Bindu Chakra.

See also
Bindudham temple

References

Sources

Further reading

External links

 Bindu
 Bindu: Pinnacle of the Three Streams
 Bindu Chakra Complete Description by Paramhans Swami Maheshwarananda

Chakras